Vibes is the second studio album by American rapper Theophilus London. The album was released on November 4, 2014, by Warner Bros. Records. The album features guest appearances from Leon Ware, Kanye West, Jesse Boykins III, Soko, Devonte Hynes and Force MDs. The album was supported by the single "Tribe".

Background
In November 2014, in an interview with Nah Right, he spoke about how long it took to make the album, saying: "Two years. The first six months I would say I started the early production meetings with the people I wanted to work with. This album is like my very first album because nobody from the label or nobody said, “Yo, go write with this person.” This is all pre-thought like, “Who do I want to pick and start the ideas with?” When it comes to making music I'm very timid. I'm not nervous but I'm very timid. I know that I have to do good. Without Kanye's name attached to it, trust me I would have put out a raw as fuck album and people would be like, “Yo let’s go, let’s do this!” That's me, I'm going to build a vibe and go. So the people I got to work with really shaped the album."

London moved to Palm Springs, Florida where he bought an old house and built a studio in it to make the album. After inviting Leon Ware over the two wrote the project in the house for over a year.

He also spoke about Kanye West executive producing the album, saying: "It’s super special. He doesn’t executive produce nobody’s album. He just do features. And in the next few years he’s just focused on Yeezy season and nobody’s going to drop an album when he does [laughs] and I’m going to be super irrelevant. I’m glad my album came out right now and not when his album is about to come out. It’s dope though. It’s like sometimes I want to pinch myself. It’s one of those moments man. It’s like if I were to work with Michael Jackson and shit. I’m happy I get to do business with people, I know people can’t listen to my album in one day and have 700+ replies to me saying, “This is the most incredible album of the year, 10/10.” I get more people excited that one of the highest brow artists and one of the lowest brow artists meet up. People are excited about that, that's dope for me–that Kanye would work with a kid like me, that's a great message."

Singles
On September 2, 2014, the album's first single "Tribe" featuring Jesse Boykins III was released. On November 4, 2014, the music video was released for "Tribe" featuring Jesse Boykins III.

Critical response

Vibes received positive reviews from music critics. At Metacritic, which assigns a normalized rating out of 100 to reviews from critics, the album received an average score of 71, which indicates "generally favorable reviews", based on 6 reviews. Scott Simpson of Exclaim! said, "Does Vibes serve as the great artistic outlet London makes it out to be? No. But what the album does have going for it is its overarching aesthetic: It's an album that has a nice enough groove throughout, and again, the quality of the production really cannot be overstated. Maybe London should have let the album speak for itself." Steven Goldstein of HipHopDX said, "Time off, a tighter central theme and spirited assists from some legendary producers makes Theophilus London’s second full-length his best yet. What’s being escaped is up to you, but Vibes succeeds in getting its listener to flourish in a world of champagne toasts, faceless women and impulsive dancing." Eli Schwadron of XXL stated, "Theophilus London’s musical ability is evident throughout Vibes, a mesh-mash of genres that come together to form one of the better listenings of 2014. The album sounds like a bit of a throwback at times, yet London makes it feel new at the same time. He poses a dual threat—singer/rapper—which results in wider appeal. Vibes is a breath of fresh air."

Track listing
Credits adapted from London's official website.

Notes
  signifies a co-producer.
  signifies an arranger.
Sample credits
 "Neu Law" contains a portion of the composition “The Law” written by John Maus as performed by John Maus.
 "Take and Look" contains a portion of the composition “Take a Look” written by Alain Seghir, Brigitte Balian, and Catherine Loy as performed by Martin Dupont.
 "Can't Stop" contains a portion of the composition “You Can't Stop My Love” written by Alain Seghir, Brigitte Balian, and Catherine Loy as performed by Martin Dupont.
 "Figure It Out" contains a portion of the composition “What You Want” written by Mason Betha, Sean Combs, Curtis Mayfield, Nashiem Myrick, and Keisha Spivey as performed by Mase from album Harlem World.

Personnel
Credits are adapted from the album's liner notes.

 Theophilus London — A&R, composer, creative director, creative producer, lyricist, primary artist, producer, vocals
 Kanye West — arranger, composer, executive producer, featured artist
 Leon Ware — composer, creative producer, featured artist, producer
 88-Keys — composer, producer
 Virgil Abloh — creative director
 Pierre Baigorry — producer
 Brigitte Balian — composer
 Brittany Barber — composer, vocals 
 Miri Ben-Ari — composer, string arrangements, strings, violin, violin arrangement
 Mason Betha — composer
 Jesse Boykins III — composer, featured artist
 Brodinski — composer, producer
 Cid Rim — producer
 Club Cheval — composer, producer
 Sean Combs — composer
 Paul Falcone — mixing
 Norman Feels— composer
 Jeff Fenster — A&R
 The Force M.D.'s — composer, featured artist
 Devonté Hynes — composer, featured artist
 Anthony Killhoffer — mixing
 Karl Lagerfeld — art direction, photography
 Catherine Loy — composer
 John Maus — composer
 Curtis Mayfield — composer
 Jack Minihan — A&R
 Mike Moore — composer
 Nashiem Myrick	— composer
 Adam Pavao — composer, producer
 Kyle Ross — mixing assistant
 Sarah Ruba — composer
 Alain Seghir — composer
 James Smith — composer
 Soko — composer, featured artist
 Keisha Spivey — composer
 Andrew Watt — composer

References

2014 albums
Albums produced by 88-Keys
Warner Records albums
Theophilus London albums